Creobota grossipunctella is a species of snout moth in the genus Creobota. It was described by Émile Louis Ragonot in 1888 and is known from Australia.

References

Moths described in 1888
Phycitini